The Ministry of Foreign Affairs of Russia main building is one of seven Stalinist skyscrapers, designed and overseen by Vladimir Gelfreykh and Adolf Minkus.

History 
The skyscraper was laid down in 1948 and completed in 1953. According to the biography of the architect Minkus (published in 1982), draft plans were first drawn up in 1946 and ranged from 9 to 40 stories. In 1947 two designs were proposed: one utilized layered setbacks while the other called for a more streamlined construction which culminated in a blunt rectangular top. In the second and approved design a metal spire, presumably ordered by Joseph Stalin, was hastily added to the tower's roof.
Currently the building houses the offices for the Ministry of Foreign Affairs of Russia.

Architecture

The building 
The building has been attributed similarities with the Woolworth Building in Manhattan. The architectural appearance dates back to the English Gothic: its feature is the rigid ribs that emphasise the height of the building and its upward thrust. The building has a tiered structure with the masses gradually narrowing and easing upwards. The ends of the tiers, unlike other high-rises, are flat – without towers or vases and decorated with merlons.

The central part of the building consists of 27 floors and its height is 172 metres. The plinth is clad in red granite and the façade is in light ceramic blocks. On the main façade, at a height of 114 metres, there is the coat of arms of the USSR mounted in reinforced concrete and covering an area of 144 m2. The portals of the building are decorated with metal lattices and stucco made by sculptor Georgy Motovilov. The portals are flanked by large obelisks of dark grey stone. The central part of the high-rise passes into side 16-storey wings through ledges of tiers, and behind them into 6-storey wings. These enclosures link the massing of the building to the surrounding residential area.

Interiors 
The total area of all the premises of the MFA is 65 thousand m2 (a cubic footprint of 402,000 m³), of which about two thousand are working and service rooms. A total of 28 lifts were installed in the building at the time of its construction, including 18 high-speed lifts.

The lobby is lined with light marble. The walls, columns, friezes on the walls as well as the floors are carpeted in polished black granite. The stained glass doors, doorframes, capitals and grilles are made of brass and brass-anodised aluminium. Four escalators lead from the vestibule to the underground cloakroom.

The walls of the assembly hall, which can seat 500 people, are clad in artificial marble. The furniture and woodwork are made of Karelian birch and polished walnut, the armchairs and drapes are upholstered in red velvet.

Notes

External links

 Building data at emporis.com

Government buildings completed in 1953
Stalinist architecture
Seven Sisters (Moscow)
Skyscraper office buildings in Moscow
Arbat District
Cultural heritage monuments of regional significance in Moscow
Ministry of Foreign Affairs (Russia)